Mari Paz Vilas Dono (born 1 February 1988) is a Spanish footballer who plays as a forward for Primera División club Levante Las Planas. She is graduated with a Bachelor of Physiotherapy.

Career
Vilas started her senior career at local team Atlético Arousana until 2006, when she signed for Levante UD for making her debut in Primera División.

In 2008, Vilas moved to RCD Espanyol, and three years later, she signed with FC Barcelona.

In 2013, the Galician player moved to Valencia CF.

International career
She was a member of the Spanish national team during the 2009 European Championship qualifying, scoring a goal in her first match against Northern Ireland. Previously she scored the first of Spain's two goals in the 2007 Under-19 Euro.

Vilas set a new UEFA Women's Championship record in April 2012 when she scored seven goals in her team's 13–0 win over Kazakhstan marking her return to the national team.

International goals

Honours

Club
Levante UD
 Primera División: Winner 2007–08
 Copa de la Reina de Fútbol: Winner 2007

FC Barcelona
 Copa de la Reina de Fútbol: Winner 2011
 Copa Catalunya: Winner 2009, 2010

RCD Espanyol
 Copa de la Reina de Fútbol: Winner 2012

Valencia CF
 Copa de la Reina de Fútbol: Runner-up 2015

International
Spain
 Cyprus Cup: Winner, 2018

References

External links
 

1988 births
Living people
Footballers from Vilagarcía de Arousa
Spanish women's footballers
Women's association football forwards
Levante UD Femenino players
FC Barcelona Femení players
RCD Espanyol Femenino players
Valencia CF Femenino players
Real Betis Féminas players
Primera División (women) players
Spain women's youth international footballers
Spain women's international footballers
UEFA Women's Euro 2017 players